Ramanlal Vora is an Indian politician of the Bharatiya Janata Party from Gujarat state of India. He is elected to Gujarat Legislative Assembly for five consecutive terms from Idar from 1995 to 2017. He was serving as a speaker of Gujarat Legislative Assembly since 22 August 2016.

Career
Ramanlal Vora, son of Indian independence activist Ishwarlal Vora, is a retired Bank Employee and was associated with the Trade Union Activities.  He was the Secretary, Ahmedabad City BJP Unit.  He is a member of Gujarat State BJP Executive Committee since 1992 and has also performed duties as President of Gujarat State BJP Scheduled Cast Morcha.

He was elected M.L.A. in 1995 from Idar constituency and became Deputy Minister, Energy, Petrochemicals  and Co-Operation Department. In 1998 he was re-elected from the same constituency and became State Minister for Co-Operation (Independent Charge) and Administrative Reforms.

He was re-elected for the third time in 2002 from Idar constituency and has held cabinet rank as Minister for Social Justice & Empowerment, Labour & Employment Department. He is (Prabhari) In-charge Minister of Sabarkantha, Dahod, Kutch and Surendranagar District. He has been re-elected for the fourth time in 2007 from Idar constituency and has held cabinet rank as Minister for Education, (Primary, Secondary, Adult), Higher and Technical Education Department. He again won from Idar in 2012.

He lost in 2017 Gujarat Legislative Assembly election from Dasada against Indian National Congress candidate Naushadji Solanki. He constested again from Idar in 2022.

References

Living people
State cabinet ministers of Gujarat
People from Sabarkantha district
1952 births
Gujarat MLAs 1995–1998
Gujarat MLAs 1998–2002
Gujarat MLAs 2002–2007
Gujarat MLAs 2007–2012
Bharatiya Janata Party politicians from Gujarat
Gujarat MLAs 2012–2017
Speakers of the Gujarat Legislative Assembly